Wilmer or Wilmers may refer to:

Places
Wilmer, Alabama, United States, an unincorporated community
Wilmer, Louisiana, United States, an unincorporated hamlet
Wilmer, Texas, United States, a city
Wilmer, British Columbia, Canada, a settlement

Surname

Wilmer
Clive Wilmer (born 1945), British poet
Douglas Wilmer (1920–2016), English actor
Elizabeth Wilmer, American mathematician
Emmanuel Wilmer (died 2005), Haitian killed in political violence
Franke Wilmer (born 1950), American politician
Heiner Wilmer (born 1961), German Roman Catholic bishop
James Jones Wilmer (1750–1814), Episcopal priest and U.S. Senate chaplain
Val Wilmer (born 1941), British photographer and writer
William Holland Wilmer (1782–1827), Episcopal priest, author and president of College of William and Mary

Wilmers
Mary-Kay Wilmers (born 1938), British journal editor
Robert G. Wilmers (1934–2017), American banker
Wilhelm Wilmers (1817–1899), German Jesuit professor of philosophy and theology

Given name
Wilmer Aguirre (born 1983), Peruvian football player
Wilmer Allison (1904–1977), American tennis player
Wilmer L. Barrow (1903–1975), American electrical engineer
Wílmer Cabrera (born 1967), Colombian football player
Wilmer Calderon (born 1975), Puerto Rican-American actor
Wilmer Carter (born 1941), California State Assemblywoman
Wilmer Crisanto (born 1989), Honduran football player
Wilmer Difo (born 1992), Dominican baseball player
Wilmer D. Elfrink (1893–1948), American football and basketball coach
Wilmer Fields (1922–2004), American baseball player
Wilmer Clemont Fields (1922–2018), American Southern Baptist executive, newspaper editor, and author
Wilmer Flores (born 1991), Venezuelan baseball player
Wilmer Font (born 1990), Venezuelan baseball player
Wilmer Angier Jennings (1910–1990), African American printmaker
Wilmer Kousemaker (born 1985), Dutch footballer
Wílmer López (born 1971), Costa Rican football player
Wilmer McLean (1814–1882), grocer from Virginia, associated with the American Civil War
Wilmer Mizell (1930–1999), American baseball player
Wilmer Ruperti (born 1960), Venezuelan-born shipping business magnate
Wilmer Stultz (1900–1929), American pilot
Wilmer W. Tanner (1909–2011), American zoologist
Wilmer Valderrama (born 1980), American actor
Wilmer Vásquez (born 1981), Venezuelan boxer
Wilmer Velásquez (born 1972), Honduran football player
Wilmer Cave Wright (1868–1951), British-born American classical philologist

Other uses
Wilmer Eye Institute, Johns Hopkins Hospital
Wilmer Cook, a character in The Maltese Falcon and its film adaptations
Candice Wilmer, a character in the Heroes graphic novels and television series

See also
 
Wilmer Cutler Pickering Hale and Dorr, a law firm
Wilmer X, a Swedish rock band